Lollar is a surname. Notable people with the surname include:

Barbara Sherwood Lollar (born 1963), Canadian geologist
Charles Lollar (born 1971), American businessman and politician
Phil Lollar (born 1959), American voice actor and producer
Ron Lollar (born 1948–2018), American politician
Sherm Lollar (1924-1977), American baseball player
Slick Lollar (1905–1945), American football player
Tim Lollar (born 1956), American baseball player
Tom Lollar (born 1951), American ceramist